Shipilovo is a rural locality (a village) in Golovinskoye Rural Settlement, Sudogodsky District, Vladimir Oblast, Russia. The population was 43 as of 2010.

Geography 
Shipilovo is located on the Kamenka River, 14 km west of Sudogda (the district's administrative centre) by road. Druzhnoye is the nearest rural locality.

References 

Rural localities in Sudogodsky District